Giampietro is a given name. Notable people with the given name include:

Giampietro Campana (1808–1880), Italian art collector
Giampietro Cicoria (born 1984), Swiss footballer
Giampietro Perrulli (born 1985), Italian footballer
Giampietro Puppi (1917–2006), Italian physicist
Giampietro Silvio (1495 – 1552), Italian painter
Giampietro Stocco (born 1961), Italian science fiction and alternate history author
Giampietro Zanotti (1674–1765), Italian painter and art historian

See also
Giampietro, surname